Monika Bosilj (born 23 December 1985) is a Croatian female professional basketball player. Bosilj played basketball at Florida International University until 2010. She represented Croatia at the 2013 EuroBasket.

In 2018, Bosilj returned to education at Durham University, where she played a season for the Durham Palatinates.

References

External links
Profile at eurobasket.com

1985 births
Living people
Basketball players from Mostar
Croats of Bosnia and Herzegovina
Croatian women's basketball players
Small forwards
ŽKK Gospić players
ŽKK Novi Zagreb players
Alumni of Durham University